Letitia Dunbar-Harrison (4 February 1906 – 1994) was an Irish librarian who became the subject of a controversy over her appointment. A graduate of Trinity College Dublin, she is the subject of the 2009 book by Pat Walsh, The Curious Case of the Mayo Librarian, and a RTÉ documentary of the same name.

Mayo county librarian controversy
In 1930, a vacancy for county librarian arose in County Mayo, the county with the smallest non-Catholic minority in Ireland. Dunbar-Harrison was recommended for the role by the Local Appointments Commission. The Library Committee of Mayo County Council, mostly consisting of prominent local Catholics as well as a bishop, refused to endorse the recommendation, claiming her grasp of Irish was inadequate. During the debate, it was asked "could a Protestant be trusted to hand out books to Catholics?".

The County Council did not sanction her nomination. In response, the government dissolved the County Council and replaced it with a Commissioner who appointed Dunbar-Harrison to the role of county librarian.

The government's stance was strongly opposed by some prominent Catholic clerics and politicians, including Opposition leader Éamon de Valera. Despite the government standing its ground on the appointment, a boycott of the library ensued which eventually resulted in W. T. Cosgrave, President of the Executive Council, and Catholic Archbishop of Tuam, Dr. Thomas Gilmartin, coming to an agreement to transfer Dunbar-Harrison from Mayo to a Department of Defence post in Dublin in January 1932.

Debate about motives for non-appointment
The reason given by the County Council for not appointing her as librarian was her insufficient grasp of Irish:

Éamon de Valera, the then leader of Fianna Fáil, said in the Dáil that:

 

J. J. Lee suggested that the resentment of local people towards the Local Appointments Commission for appointing someone with little or no local connections may also have been a factor, but argued that sectarianism was also involved:

He cited one J.T. Morahan who was:

Michael D. Higgins also suggested that sectarianism was a factor:
 

Professor John A. Murphy argued that it was a case of local versus national government:

The government resolved the situation by offering her a post in the Military Library in Dublin, which she accepted.

Life after Mayo controversy
She had met a Methodist minister, Reverend Robert Crawford, while in Castlebar. They married a few months after she started work in the Military Library, and she then became known as Aileen Crawford. Because of the marriage bar she had to resign her post.

The couple lived in Waterford, Tipperary, Louth and Antrim and had no children. After being widowed in the 1950s, she remained in Northern Ireland.

She attempted to become a Methodist minister, but was failed on one of her written exams for the post. She remained an active member of her church for many years and died in 1994.

Bibliography
Enda Delaney, Demography, State and Society: Irish Migration to Britain, 1921-1971. Liverpool University Press, 2000.

References

1906 births
1994 deaths
Irish librarians
Women librarians
Republic of Ireland
Alumni of Trinity College Dublin